The Glorious Cross of Dozulé, also known as Croix d’amour in France and as Cruz de Amor in Portugal, is a project of an illuminated cross, already not entirely recognized by the hierarchy of the Catholic Church, coloured white and blue 7,38m tall with arms 1,23m long, which means with an exact proportion of a ratio of 3 between the vertical and horizontal length, based on the reported apparitions of Jesus Christ to Madeleine Aumont and should to be erected in Dozulé, a small town in Normandy, located about 25 km from Lisieux in France.

Origins of the Cross 

Between 1972 and 1978, Jesus Christ is said to have appeared 49 times in Dozulé to Madeleine Aumont, a mother of five children, in the presence of her parish priest Victor L’Horset and other faithful people, and is believed to have dictated a series of messages, containing teachings and of warnings for all people, according to those who believe in them. Among them is the daily «Prayer of Dozulé». The messages are seen as an annunciation of the return of Christ. The construction of the Glorious Cross is seen as a sign of it.

The followers of the messages of Dozulé believe also that they are the continuation of the Three Secrets of Fátima and that they ask, for the conversion of humanity to avoid a material and spiritual catastrophe.

Connections to Cults and Anti-Communism 
The cross is an apocalyptic symbol, not full recognized by the hierarchy of the Catholic Church, connected to anti-communist rhetoric. It is seen as a means of salvation: those who do not possess the cross shall be damned. It was popularized in Portugal by the Fraternidade Missionária de Cristo-Jovem (Missionary Fraternity of Young Christ), a religious community made by a Catholic priest and several nuns.

The daily prayer of Dozulé 
 
The followers of Dozulé apparitions believe that Jesus revealed to Madeleine Aumont that the faithful are to recite this prayer every day, beginning with the sign of the Cross:

"Jesus of Nazareth has triumphed over death-His reign is eternal. He comes to triumph over the world and time.

Mercy my God, on those who blaspheme You; forgive them for they know not what they do.

Mercy my God, for the scandal in the world; deliver them from the spirit of satan.

Mercy my God, on those who run away from You; give them a taste for the Holy Eucharist.

Mercy my God, on those who shall come to repent at the foot of the Glorious Cross. May they find there, Peace and Joy in God our Savior.

Mercy my God, so that Your Kingdom come, but save us... as there is still time... for the time is near and I AM coming. Amen.

Come Lord Jesus, we attend You. Amen."

Friends of the Glorious Cross of Dozulé 

The Friends of the Glorious Cross of Dozulé (in French: Amis de la Croix Glorieuse de Dozulé) is a Christian movement founded in the 1980s in the Calvados département, France. It is based on the reported private revelations received by Madeleine Aumount in Dozulé in the 1970s, but sustained on several "new messages" received by an alleged mystic, self-styled JNSR, that confirmed as true the Madeleine's messages. However, JNSR predicted the end of the world, preceding by many catastrophes, and published a new «Message of Dozulé» which contains the doctrine of this group. In 1995, this group (totally separated from the original Dozulé apparitions) was considered as a cult in the 1995 parliamentary report on cults, and by anti-cult associations (ADFI, CCMM), notably because of its apocalypticism.

See also 
 Dozulé
 Visions of Jesus and Mary
 Marian apparition

References

External links 

 The Glorious Cross of Dozulé
 Message of Jesus Christ in Dozulé (Calvados) France
 Friends of the Glorious Cross of Dozulé

Christian denominations founded in France
Cross symbols